Marcus Mustac Gudmann (born 27 February 2000) is a Danish footballer who plays as a centre-back for AB in the Danish 2nd Division.

Club career

FC Nordsjælland
Gudmann came to FC Nordsjælland at the age of 11 from Ledøje-Smørum, where he had played since he was 6 years old. In January 2017, Gudmann signed a 2,5-year youth contract with Nordsjælland.

Gudmann's first senior experience was on 3 January 2018, where he sat on the bench for the whole game against Silkeborg IF. He got his debut for FC Nordsjælland on 11 November 2018. Gudmann started on the bench, but replaced Ulrik Yttergård Jenssen in the 60th minute in a 1-1 draw against Randers FC in the Danish Superliga.

On 9 January 2019, Gudmann signed his first professional contract and would become a permanent part of the first team from the summer 2019.

On the transfer deadline day, 31 January 2020, Gudmann was loaned out to Danish 1st Division club FC Roskilde for the rest of the season.

Kolding IF
On 2 October 2020, Gudmann joined Danish 1st Division club Kolding IF, signing a one-year contract. After a total of 17 appearances throughout the 2020-21 season, Kolding confirmed on 27 May 2021, that Gudmann was one of seven players that would leave the club.

Esbjerg
On 30 June 2021, Gudmann moved to Esbjerg fB on a deal until June 2023. After a first season, which ended with a relegation to the Danish 2nd Division, the club confirmed on 5 August 2022, that Gudmann's contract had been terminated by mutual agreement.

AB
After leaving Esbjerg, Gudmann joined Danish 2nd Division club AB in August 2022.

References

External links
 
 Marcus Gudmann at DBU 

2000 births
Living people
Danish men's footballers
Danish people of Serbian descent
Danish Superliga players
Danish 1st Division players
Ledøje-Smørum Fodbold players
FC Nordsjælland players
FC Roskilde players
Kolding IF players
Esbjerg fB players
Akademisk Boldklub players
Denmark youth international footballers
Association football defenders